The Stark County Courthouse and its Annex are listed on the National Register of Historic Places for Canton, Ohio. The courthouse building was designed by Cleveland, Ohio based  architect George F. Hammond in 1895. The building is considered to be in the Beaux Arts Architecture style reflecting Classicism styles. The clock tower is also adorned with statues of trumpeting angels.

References

External links

Buildings and structures in Canton, Ohio
County courthouses in Ohio
Courthouses on the National Register of Historic Places in Ohio
Beaux-Arts architecture in Ohio
Clock towers in Ohio
Government buildings completed in 1895
National Register of Historic Places in Stark County, Ohio